William Shepherd (1873 – 1955) was a Trinidadian cricketer. He played in fifteen first-class matches for Barbados and Trinidad and Tobago from 1896 to 1910.

References

External links
 

1873 births
1955 deaths
Barbados cricketers
Trinidad and Tobago cricketers
Trinidad and Tobago emigrants to Barbados